William Markham (1719 – 3 November 1807), English divine, served as Archbishop of York from 1777 until his death.

Early life
William Markham was born in 1719 to Major William Markham and Elizabeth (née Markham) of Kinsale in Ireland.

He was educated at Westminster School and at Christ Church, Oxford, where he matriculated on 6 June 1738, graduating BA 1742, MA 1745, BCL & DCL 1752.

Career
He was one of the best scholars of his day, and attained to the headship of his old school and college: he served as Headmaster of Westminster 1753–1765, and Dean of Christ Church 1767–1776. Between those headships, he held the deanery of Rochester 1765–1767. He held from time to time a number of livings, and in 1771 was made Bishop of Chester and tutor to the Prince of Wales (later George IV). In 1776 he became Archbishop of York, and also Lord High Almoner and privy councillor.

He was a fierce critic of pamphleteer Richard Price concerning the American rebellion. He was for some time a close friend of Edmund Burke, but his strong championship of Warren Hastings caused a breach. He was accused by Lord Chatham of preaching pernicious doctrines, and was a victim of the Gordon Riots in 1780.

Bishop Markham was also the person who composed the Latin memorial for George Berkeley, the famous philosopher.

Personal life
In 1759, Markham married Sarah Goddard, the daughter of John Goddard, a wealthy English merchant of Rotterdam, with whom he had six sons and seven daughters:

William Markham (1760–1815), of the East India Company, Private Secretary to Governor-General Warren Hastings
John Markham (1761–1827), Admiral of the Royal Navy, First Sea Lord
George Markham (1763–1822), Dean of York
Henrietta Sarah Markham (1764–1844), married Ewan Law MP
Elizabeth Catherine Markham (1765–1820), married William Barnett (as his second wife)
David Markham (1766–1795), Lieutenant-Colonel of the 20th Regiment of Foot, killed in the Second Maroon War in Jamaica
Robert Markham (1768–1837), Archdeacon of York
Osborne Markham (1769–1827), MP for Calne
Alicia Henrietta Markham (1771–1840), married Rev. Henry Foster Mills
Georgina Markham (1772–1793), died unmarried
Frederica Markham (1774–1860), married David William Murray, 3rd Earl of Mansfield
Anne Katherine Markham (1778–1808), died unmarried
Cecilia Markham (1783–1865), married Rev. Robert Philip Goodenough

Descendants
His granddaughter, Laura Markham, the second daughter of his son William, married William Mure, the Scottish scholar and politician who sat in the Parliament of the United Kingdom from 1846–55 as the Conservative MP for Renfrewshire and was Laird of Caldwell in Ayrshire. Their daughter, Emma Mure, (1833–1911) married Thomas Lister, 3rd Baron Ribblesdale (1828–1876) and had Thomas Lister, 4th Baron Ribblesdale.

His granddaughter, Emma Markham, another daughter of his son William, married the politician William Crompton-Stansfield who sat in the Parliament of the United Kingdom from 1837–53 as Whig Member of Parliament (MP) for Huddersfield.

Memorial

See also
Markham, Ontario – named for him by his friend John Graves Simcoe, Lieutenant Governor of Upper Canada.

Footnotes

References

External links
 William Markham at the Eighteenth-Century Poetry Archive (ECPA)

1719 births
1807 deaths
People educated at Westminster School, London
Alumni of Christ Church, Oxford
Archbishops of York
Bishops of Chester
Deans of Rochester
18th-century Anglican archbishops
19th-century Anglican archbishops
Deans of Christ Church, Oxford
Head Masters of Westminster School
18th-century Church of England bishops